The Toleration Act 1688 (1 Will & Mary c 18), also referred to as the Act of Toleration, was an Act of the Parliament of England. Passed in the aftermath of the Glorious Revolution, it received royal assent on 24 May 1689.

The Act allowed for freedom of worship to nonconformists who had pledged to the oaths of Allegiance and Supremacy and rejected transubstantiation, i.e., to Protestants who dissented from the Church of England such as Baptists, Congregationalists or English Presbyterians, but not to Roman Catholics. Nonconformists were allowed their own places of worship and their own schoolteachers, so long as they accepted certain oaths of allegiance. 

The Act intentionally did not apply to Roman Catholics, Jews, nontrinitarians, and atheists. It continued the existing social and political disabilities for dissenters, including their exclusion from holding political offices and also from the universities. Dissenters were required to register their meeting houses and were forbidden from meeting in private homes. Any preachers who dissented had to be licensed.

Between 1772 and 1774, Edward Pickard gathered together dissenting ministers, to campaign for the terms of the Toleration Act for dissenting clergy to be modified. Under his leadership, Parliament twice considered bills to modify the law, but both were unsuccessful and it was not until Pickard and many others had ended their efforts that a new attempt was made in 1779.  The Act was amended in 1779 by substituting belief in Scripture for belief in the Thirty-Nine Articles of the Anglican churches, but some penalties on holding property remained. Penalties against Unitarians were finally removed in the Doctrine of the Trinity Act 1813.

Background

During both the English Commonwealth and the reign of Charles II, nonconforming dissenters including Roman Catholics, were subject to religious persecution and precluded from holding official office. Following the restoration of Charles II, Anglican leaders debated in correspondence and public sermon the extent to which the Anglican church should allow doctrinal latitude; this debate was related to the corresponding debate on broadening church membership and tolerating dissenters. The succession of the Roman Catholic James II was challenged on religious grounds prior to his accession in what became known as the Exclusion Crisis and after he took the crown in 1686  in the Monmouth Rebellion. However, the Tory leadership of the Anglican church initially supported his right to rule based on the theology of active obedience to the monarch. James II sought a repeal of the Test Acts, which imposed various civil disabilities on both Catholics and Protestant non-conformists, to broaden his political support and allow for the appointment of Roman Catholics to civilian and military roles. Failing to secure parliamentary support, James II's attempt to dispense with the Test Acts through the 1687 and 1688 Declarations of Indulgence helped spark the constitutional crises that culminated in the Glorious Revolution and the accession of William and Mary, who became joint sovereigns. A series of Acts of parliament assured a new constitutional settlement of this situation; these include the Bill of Rights 1689, the Crown and Parliament Recognition Act 1689, the Mutiny Act 1689, the Toleration Act 1688, and later the Act of Settlement 1701 and the Act of Union 1707.

The historian Kenneth Pearl sees the Act of Toleration as "in many ways a compromise bill. To get nonconformists' (Protestants who were not members of the Church of England) support in the crucial months of 1688". Both the Whig and Tory parties that had rallied around William and Mary had promised nonconformists that such an act would be enacted if the revolution succeeded. James II had himself issued an act of toleration, but nonconformists believed James II's efforts to undermine their civil liberties and circumvent parliament placed the religious liberties provided via the Declarations of Indulgence at risk. 

Catholics and Unitarians were not hunted down after the Act was passed but they still had no right to assemble and pray. As there still remained a Test Act, non-Anglicans (including all Protestant non-Conformists, Jews, Catholics, and Unitarians) could not sit in Parliament even following the passage of the Toleration Act 1688. The Toleration Act of 1712, passed following the union between Scotland and England, granted limited toleration, specifically the right to worship for Scottish Episcopalians who prayed for the monarch and used the English Book of Common Prayer. Unitarians were only granted toleration after the Doctrine of the Trinity Act 1813; prior to that time, denying the Trinity was a capital offence in Scotland.

The Test Act remained in force until the nineteenth century.

Influences
Historians (such as John J. Patrick) see John Locke's A Letter Concerning Toleration advocating religious toleration (written in 1685 and published in 1689) as "the philosophical foundation for the English Act of Toleration of 1689". While Locke had advocated coexistence between the Church of England (the established church) and dissenting Protestant denominations (including Congregationalists, Baptists, Presbyterians, and Quakers) he had excluded Catholics from toleration – the same policy that the Act of Toleration enacted.

Implementation in the overseas colonies
The terms of the Act of Toleration within the English colonies in America were applied either by charter or by acts by the royal governors. The ideas of toleration as advocated by Locke (which excluded Roman Catholics) became accepted through most of the colonies, even in the Congregational strongholds within New England which had previously punished or excluded dissenters. The colonies of Pennsylvania, Rhode Island, Delaware, and New Jersey went further than the Act of Toleration by outlawing the establishment of any church and allowing a greater religious diversity. Within the colonies Roman Catholics were allowed to practise their religion freely only in Pennsylvania and Maryland.

Provisions

Section 5
This section, from "bee it" to "aforesaid that" was repealed by section 1 of, and Part I of the Schedule to, the Statute Law Revision Act 1888.

In this section, the words "as aforesaid" were repealed by section 1 of, and Schedule 1 to, the Statute Law Revision Act 1948.

Section 8
This section, from "bee it" to "aforesaid that" was repealed by section 1 of, and Part I of the Schedule to, the Statute Law Revision Act 1888.

Section 15
This section, from "bee it" to "aforesaid" was repealed by section 1 of, and Part I of the Schedule to, the Statute Law Revision Act 1888.

In this section, the words "after the tenth day of June" were repealed by section 1 of, and Schedule 1 to, the Statute Law Revision Act 1948.

Section 18
Section 6 of the Ecclesiastical Courts Jurisdiction Act 1860 provided that nothing contained thereinbefore in that Act was to be taken to repeal or alter section 18 of the Toleration Act 1688.

Repeal
The whole Act, except section 5 and so much of section 8 as specified the service and offices from which certain persons were exempt and section 15, was repealed by section 1 of, and Part II of Schedule 1 to, the Promissory Oaths Act 1871.

The whole Act, so far as unrepealed, was repealed by section 1 of, and Part II of the Schedule to, the Statute Law (Repeals) Act 1969.

Later developments
Toleration of worship was later extended to Protestants who did not believe in Trinitarian doctrine in the Unitarians Relief Act 1813. Catholics were allowed to worship under strict conditions through the Roman Catholic Relief Act 1791. As time went on, oaths and tests that barred non-conformists and Roman Catholics from holding public offices, keeping schools, and owning land were rescinded by laws such as Roman Catholic Relief Act, 1778, the Roman Catholic Charities Act 1832, the Test Abolition Act 1867, the Promissory Oaths Act 1868, the Promissory Oaths Act 1871 and the Oaths Act 1978. The Roman Catholic Relief Act 1829 allowed followers of that religion to be elected to Parliament and to hold most offices under the Crown, while the Jews Relief Act 1858 had a similar effect for adherents of Judaism. The Religious Disabilities Act 1846 ended restrictions on Roman Catholics for education, charities, and owning property, although Oxford, Cambridge, and Durham universities were allowed to continue to exclude Roman Catholics until Universities Tests Act 1871 took effect. By the passage of the Places of Worship Registration Act 1855, an optional system of registration for non-Anglican places of worship was passed which gave certain legal and fiscal advantages for those that registered, and "alternative religion was not only lawful, but was often facilitated by the law."

See also
Baptist Confession of Faith of 1689
Catholic Emancipation
Freedom of religion
Maryland Toleration Act – gave Protestants and Catholics the right to worship freely in Maryland
Religious toleration
Religion in the United Kingdom
Puritan's Pit

References

Further reading
 Grell, Ole Peter, and Jonathan Irvine Israel. From persecution to toleration: the Glorious Revolution and religion in England (Oxford UP, 1991).
 Mullett, Charles F. "The Legal Position of English Protestant Dissenters, 1689–1767." Virginia Law Review (1937): 389–418. in JSTOR
 Spurr, John. "The Church of England, comprehension and the Toleration Act of 1689." English Historical Review 104.413 (1989): 927–946. in JSTOR
 Wykes, David L. "Friends, parliament and the toleration act." Journal of Ecclesiastical History 45.01 (1994): 42–63. 
 Zwicker, Laura. "Politics of Toleration: The Establishment Clause and the Act of Toleration Examined, The." Indiana Law Journal 66 (1990): 773+. online

Anti-Catholicism in the United Kingdom
1689 in law
1689 in England
Acts of the Parliament of England concerning religion
Christianity and law in the 17th century
1689 in Christianity
Edicts of toleration